Hamlet's Mill: An Essay Investigating the Origins of Human Knowledge and Its Transmission Through Myth (first published by Gambit, Boston, 1969) by Giorgio de Santillana (a professor of the history of science at MIT) and Hertha von Dechend  (a scientist at 
Johann Wolfgang Goethe-Universität) is a nonfiction work of history and comparative mythology, particularly the subfield of archaeoastronomy.  
It is mostly about the claim of a Megalithic era discovery of axial precession and the encoding of this knowledge in mythology. The book was severely criticized by academics upon its publication.

Argument

The main argument of the book may be summarized as the claim of an early (Neolithic) discovery of the precession of the equinoxes (usually attributed to Hipparchus, 2nd century BCE), and an associated very long-lived Megalithic civilization of "unsuspected sophistication" that was particularly preoccupied with astronomical observation.
The knowledge of this civilization about precession, and the associated astrological ages,
would have been encoded in mythology, typically in the form of a story relating to a millstone and a young protagonist—the "Hamlet's Mill" of the book's title, a reference to the kenning  Amlóða kvern recorded in the Old Icelandic Skáldskaparmál.<ref>
Chapter VI, Amlodhi's Quern: "Shakespeare's Gentle Prince [...] who was known once upon a time as a personage of no ordinary power, of universal position, and, in the North, as the owner of a formidable mill. [...] The Mill is thus not only very great and ancient, but it must also be central to the original Hamlet story. It reappears in the ' Skaldskaparmal, where Snorri explains why a kenning for gold is 'Frodhi's meal'"
</ref>
The authors indeed claim that mythology is primarily to be interpreted as in terms of archaeoastronomy ("mythological language has exclusive reference to celestial phenomena"), and they mock alternative interpretations in terms of fertility or agriculture.

The book's project is an examination of the "relics, fragments and allusions that have survived the steep attrition of the ages". 
In particular, the book reconstructs a myth of a heavenly mill which rotates around the celestial pole and grinds out the world's salt and soil, and is associated with the maelstrom. The millstone falling off its frame represents the passing of one age's pole star (symbolized by a ruler or king of some sort), and its restoration and the overthrow of the old king of authority and the empowering of the new one the establishment of a new order of the age (a new star moving into the position of pole star). 
The authors attempt to demonstrate the prevalence of influence of this hypothetical civilization's ideas by analysing the world's mythology (with an eye especially to all "mill myths") using 

Santillana and Dechend state in their introduction to Hamlet's Mill that they are well aware of modern interpretations of myth and folklore but find them shallow and lacking insight: "...the experts now are benighted by the current folk fantasy, which is the belief that they are beyond all this - critics without nonsense and extremely wise". Consequently, Santillana and Dechend prefer to rely on the work of "meticulous scholars such as Ideler, Lepsius, Chwolson, Boll and, to go farther back, of Athanasius Kircher and Petavius..."

They give reasons throughout the book for preferring the work of older scholars (and the early mythologists themselves) as the proper way to interpret myth; but this viewpoint did not sit well with their modern critics schooled in the "current anthropology, which has built up its own idea of the primitive and what came after".

Santillana had previously published, in 1961, The Origins of Scientific Thought, on which  Hamlet's Mill is substantially based. Compare various statements in Hamlet's Mill to this quotation from The Origin of Scientific Thought: "We can see then, how so many myths, fantastic and arbitrary in semblance, of which the Greek tale of the Argonaut is a late offspring, may provide a terminology of image motifs, a kind of code which is beginning to be broken. It was meant to allow those who knew (a) to determine unequivocally the position of given planets in respect to the earth, to the firmament, and to one another; (b) to present what knowledge there was of the fabric of the world in the form of tales about 'how the world began'."

ReceptionHamlet's Mill was severely criticized by academic reviewers on a number of grounds: tenuous arguments based on incorrect or outdated linguistic information; lack of familiarity with modern sources; an over-reliance on coincidence or analogy; and the general implausibility of a far-flung and influential civilization existing and not leaving behind solid evidence. At most, it has been given a grudging sort of praise. Thus, Jaan Puhvel (1970) concluded that

Writing in The New York Review of Books, Edmund Leach noted:

H. R. Ellis Davidson referred to Hamlet’s Mill as:

In contrast the classical scholar Harald Reiche positively reviewed Hamlet's Mill. Reiche was a colleague of Santillana at MIT, and himself developed the archaeoastronomical interpretation of ancient myth in a series of lectures and publications similar to Hamlet's Mill (dealing more specifically with Greek mythology), including an interpretation of "the layout of Atlantis as a sort of map of the sky".

The Swedish astronomer Peter Nilson, while recognizing that Hamlet's Mill does not qualify as a work of science, expressed admiration for it as well as it being a source of inspiration when he wrote his own book on classic mythologies based on the night sky: Himlavalvets sällsamheter (1977).

Barber & Barber (2006), itself a study aiming to "uncover seismic, geological, astrological, or other natural events" from mythology, appreciates the book for its pioneer work in mythography, judging that "Although controversial, [Santillana and von Dechend] have usefully flagged and collected Herculean amounts of relevant data." Nevertheless, the conclusions the authors draw from their data have been "virtually ignored by the scientific and scholarly establishment.”

Publishing history
The full hardcover title is Hamlet's Mill: An Essay on Myth & the Frame of Time. Later softcover editions would use Hamlet's Mill: An Essay Investigating the Origins of Human Knowledge and its Transmission Through Myth. 
The English edition was hastily assembled and published five years prior to Santillana's death. 
Hertha von Dechend (who is generally held to have written most of the book) prepared an expanded second edition several years later. 
The essay was reissued by David R. Godine, Publisher in 1992. The German translation, which appeared in 1993, is slightly longer than the original. The 8th Italian edition of 2000 was substantially expanded.

First English paperback edition: Boston: Godine, 1977
Italian editions: Giorgio de Santillana, Hertha von Dechend, Il mulino di Amleto. Saggio sul mito e sulla struttura del tempo (Milan: Adelphi, 1983, 552 pages). Giorgio de Santillana, Hertha von Dechend, Il mulino di Amleto. Saggio sul mito e sulla struttura del tempo (Milan: Adelphi, 2000, 8th expanded Italian edition, 630 pages)
German edition: Giorgio de Santillana, Hertha von Dechend: Die Mühle des Hamlet. Ein Essay über Mythos und das Gerüst der Zeit (Berlin : Kammerer und Unverzagt, 1993. )
French edition: Giorgio de Santillana; Hertha von Dechend, Claude Gaudriault (tr.) Le moulin d'Hamlet : la connaissance, origine et transmission par les mythes (Paris : Editions Edite, 2012)

See also
 Athanasius Kircher
 Charles François Dupuis
 Marcel Griaule
 Geomythology
 The Masks of God''

Further reading

References

External links
 Hamlet's Mill - Full Text
 "Homepage in Memory of Hertha von Dechend"

Mythology books
Comparative mythology
Archaeoastronomy
1969 non-fiction books
Harvard University Press books